Chorthippus bozdaghi, the Bozdagh grasshopper, is an endangered species of Orthoptera that is endemic to Bozdag Mountain, İzmir, Turkey. It has retreated up the mountains over time, and the habitat for this species is now small, isolated and damaged.

References 

bozdaghi